Bombus randeckensis is an extinct bumblebee from the Miocene rocks of the Randeck Maar in southwestern Germany. It was discovered in 2012, and initially placed in the subgenus Bombus, however, review of the Bombini fossil record by Dehon et al in 2019 concluded B. randeckensis should be placed in Bombus subgenus Cullumanobombus.

References

†
Miocene insects
Fossil taxa described in 2012
Insects described in 2012
Fossils of Germany
Fossil bee taxa
Taxa named by Michael S. Engel